Brice Mach (born 2 April 1986) is a French rugby union player who normally plays as a hooker, for French club Castres Olympique in the Top 14 and Heineken Cup. He made his debut for the national side on 21 February 2014, coming off the bench against Wales in round 3 of the 2014 Six Nations Championship.

Honours
Top 14 champions
 Castres Olympique (2012–13)

References

External links
ESPN Profile

1986 births
Living people
French rugby union players
France international rugby union players
Rugby union hookers
Sportspeople from Perpignan
AS Béziers Hérault players
Castres Olympique players
French rugby union coaches
US Montauban players
SU Agen Lot-et-Garonne players